Habenaria elongata, commonly known as the white rein orchid, or Kimberley spider orchid, is a species of orchid that is endemic to northern Australia. It has up to four leaves at its base and up to twenty small white flowers with yellowish tips and thread-like lobes on the labellum.

Description 
Flowering occurs in January and February.

Taxonomy and naming
Habenaria elongata was first formally described in 1810 by Robert Brown and the description was published in Prodromus Florae Novae Hollandiae et Insulae Van Diemen. The specific epithet (elongata) is a Latin word meaning "prolonged", referring to the three long labellum lobes.

Distribution and habitat
The white rein orchid is found in the Kimberley region of Western Australia, northern parts of the Northern Territory, on the Cape York Peninsula and in New Guinea. It grows in grassland, open forest and woodland.

References

Orchids of Queensland
Orchids of the Northern Territory
Orchids of Western Australia
Orchids of New Guinea
Endemic orchids of Australia
Plants described in 1810
elongata